The Lélé language, Lélémrin, also known as Tiagba (Tiagbamrin) after its principal town, is a Kru language spoken by ethnic Aizi (Ahizi) on the shores of Ébrié Lagoon in Ivory Coast. It is not intelligible with Mobu, also spoken by Aizi at the lagoon.

The Lele endonym for all Aizi is Prokpo for the people (or in Tiagba Krokpo), Prokpamrin for the language.

References

Kru languages
Languages of Ivory Coast
Languages of Africa